Kysucké Nové Mesto District (okres Kysucké Nové Mesto) is a district in the Žilina Region of northern central Slovakia, in the Kysuce region. It is entirely surrounded by the Žilina and Čadca districts. Apart from the city districts in Bratislava and Košice, its area is the smallest of all Slovakia districts, although population density is the second highest in Slovakia. The district had been established in 1923 and in its current borders exists from 1996. Core of the district economy is engineering industry, performed by several companies foremost in Kysucké Nové Mesto industrial park. Administrative seat is town Kysucké Nové Mesto, although many residents daily travel to Źilina for work, shopping, or education.

Municipalities 

(Δ of population) –

References

External links 
Official site

Districts of Slovakia
Žilina Region